Manfred Walter (born 31 July 1937 in Wurzen) is a German former footballer who played as a defender.

He won a bronze medal with the East German Olympic team in the 1964 Football tournament of the Tokyo Games. For the full national team Walter made 16 appearances in the mid 1960s.

In the East German Oberliga the defender scored nine goals in 243 matches. In 1963–64 Walter won the East German championship with this club BSG Chemie Leipzig.

References

External links
 
 
 
 
 

1937 births
Living people
German footballers
Olympic footballers of the United Team of Germany
Olympic bronze medalists for the United Team of Germany
Olympic medalists in football
Footballers at the 1964 Summer Olympics
Medalists at the 1964 Summer Olympics
German footballers needing infoboxes
Association football defenders
People from Wurzen
East Germany international footballers